Brandermill is a major suburban residential and commercial development in the Southside of Richmond, Virginia. It is located near Midlothian, Virginia at the southern terminus of the Powhite Parkway and is centered on the Swift Creek Reservoir. The Census Bureau defines it as a Census-designated place (CDP), with a population of 13,173 as of the most updated estimate done in 2010.

History
Chesterfield county approved the planned community of Brandermill in 1974 and construction began in 1975. 
In 1977, Brandermill developers East West Partners (then known as "The Brandermill group)  were recognized for their work when Brandermill was named "The Best Planned Community in America" by Better Homes and Gardens and the National Association of Home Builders.
It was the first planned community in Chesterfield County. It has a golf course, a church, and 3 public schools adjacent to it, Swift Creek Elementary School, Swift Creek Middle School, and Clover Hill High School.

Notorious murderer John List was arrested while living in Brandermill.

References

Geography of Chesterfield County, Virginia
Greater Richmond Region
Neighborhoods in Richmond, Virginia
Census-designated places in Virginia